Ayya Nadar Janaki Ammal College (ANJAC) is an autonomous college in Sivakasi in the Indian state of Tamil Nadu, affiliated to Madurai Kamaraj University, Madurai recognized as a 'College of Excellence' by the University Grants Commission.

This college was established by the financial support extended by two charitable trusts viz., Janaki Ammal Ayya Nadar Trust and P. IYA Nadar Charitable Trust. This college which began its operations in 1963 with beginning of offering only Pre-University program today offers 18 U.G., 16 P.G., 12 Certificate, 6 P.G. Diploma, 2 Advanced Diplomas, 10 M.Phils., and 7 Ph.D. Programmes in Science, Arts and Commerce faculties with an intake of 2,900 students and research scholars.

History
The college was founded in 1963 by Tirisha during the early phase of educational reforms and modernization of education system in Tamil Nadu brought by K Kamaraj during his chief ministership of the state.

Campus
The college campus located in a 175 acres on the Sivakasi – Srivilliputtur road, five kilometers away from Sivakasi.

Organization
The college administration is primarily governed by the managing committee, that includes Ayya and Janaki Ammal Trust members, principal and university representatives.  Autonomous functionaries and college council are responsible for the day-today activities of the academic programs.

The two charitable Trusts, viz. Janaki Ammal Ayya Nadar Trust and P. Iya Nadar Trust manage the college and extend financial support. They contribute Rs.50 lakhs on an average. In 2004–2005 the contribution was Rs.88 lakhs for promoting various activities in the college. This being an Autonomous college, the management strongly believes in decentralized governing practices, following the democratic path. The entire faculty is involved in decision-making at all levels. The faculties contribute their expertise in many major policy making bodies like governing council and college committee along with the managing committee members, the Principal, university and government representatives. All Heads of departments constitute the college council with Principal as president and it meets once in a month. Academic council deals with curriculum designing, student admissions, and co and extracurricular activities. The college council is concerned with day-to-day administration and related matters. The departments enjoy autonomy with regard to taking all decisions at their level and the same is conveyed to management. The practice of bottom-up communication is followed. The college is managed keeping in view its goals, vision and mission and has an organizational structure which effectively co-ordinates the academic as well as administrative planning. The college being an autonomous institution, has its own Board of Studies to prepare the syllabus and panel of examiners. The finance committee deals with capital expenditure and annual accounts. The planning and evaluation committee deals with campus discipline, teaching learning and welfare activities. The Awards Committee scrutinizes examination results, records and forward mark sheets and diplomas to concerned authorities. The college has co-coordinators for curriculum development cell, academic affairs and for student services. There are separate controllers of examinations for UG and PG courses who conduct examinations, fix examination fee, dates of examination, conduct terminal examinations and announce results. Under the organizational structure, ANJAC has constituted Internal Quality Assurance Cell (IQAC), the primary task of which is to develop a system for conscious, consistent and catalytic improvement in the performance of institutions. It has to be facilitative and participative unit of the institution. IQAC critically reviews and assesses the performance of all departmental committees and cells. IQAC had met 4 times during 2004–2005. Since the college is aided by Government it follows the guidelines of the Government of Tamil Nadu, university and U.G.C. Sufficient number of faculty is available in all the departments. The college has computers with Internet facility for office automation.

The main sources of finance are : grant-in-aid from T.N. Govt., Central Govt., fee from the students, contribution by management, U.G.C. assistance, self-financing courses and other funding agencies.

Academics

Curriculum

17 subjects and 70 programmes combinations. 16 new UG/PG courses all under self-funded category were introduced during the last five years, out of them 6 are IT based. In addition, computer foundation programme is offered to all non-computer students. Degree programmes are having inbuilt vocational modules. Vertical mobility is facilitated by newly started PG programmes. Such a multidimensional development of the curriculum is helpful to the learners.

Students feedback, is obtained and processed formally. Combination of learners evaluation of programmes every year, opinions of the Curriculum Development Cell of the college, findings of departmental meetings, feedback from subject experts, alumni, views of prospective employers are considered while revising the curriculum as well as in planning introduction of future programmes.

Curriculum review is conducted every year and updating and minor changes are made on continuous basis while major over all curriculum revision is undertaken once in every three years for PG and every four year for UG.

Admission
The students are admitted to the different U.G. courses based on merit cum reservation policy whereas 25% weightage is given to entrance tests for admission in the PG courses. All the seats in all the courses are filled because of demand.

Degrees
The academics program offered in most of science and humanities streams. Three year under-graduate and two year post-graduate programs are offered in different discipline. M.Phil. and PhD degrees (relatively more in number in Tamil discipline) are also awarded as part of research program.

An undergraduate Bachelor program is offered in Physical Education discipline for those who interested in training to become professional in sports.

Exams
Learners are assessed through continuous internal assessment (CIA) and terminal examinations. Double valuation of answer scripts is followed for both UG and PG programmes. For PG programme the weightage for internal and external assessment carry 50% each. The break up of the internal assessment components is test (30 marks), quiz (5 marks), assignment (5 marks) and seminar (10 marks). UG internal assessment carries 40% weightage. Complete transparency is maintained in the internal evaluation.

In order to build up confidence in the evaluation system the valued answer scripts are returned to the student for his scrutiny and an opportunity is provided to put forward his grievances if any. To over come any dispute, provision is made for revaluation. Conduct of examinations and valuation are centralized.

Research
The research cell constituted in the college creates and sustains the research culture of the college. Faculty members are motivated by providing doctoral allowance at the rate of Rs.200/- per month. Monetary assistance is also extended for publication in National and International Journals as well as for preparing thesis. Receiving grants from funding agencies are also appreciated and rewarded. Teachers are encouraged to participate in seminars with paper presentation. During the last five years 24 teachers received Ph.Ds.

Forty-four out of 144 faculty members have Ph.D. 17 research scholars received Ph.D. during the last five years. There are three on going major research projects funded by DST, DBT, with an outlay of Rs. 66.16 lakhs. Another on going research project worth Rs. 7 lakhs is funded by the Management. 5 major projects have been completed during the last five years. Out of 16 minor research projects sanctioned by the UGC during the last five years, two are yet to be completed. UGC has sanctioned Rs.100 lakhs under CPE scheme. The presence of research culture in the campus builds confidence among faculty and students on independent enquiry. The college is publishing a bi-annual scientific journal ANJAC Journal of Science. Faculty members have published 64 papers in International journals, 215 in National and 535 papers were abstracted in various seminar proceedings during the last five years.

Transfer of knowledge and skill to industry and local community has given financial returns to the college to a limited extent. Consultancy Cell of the college publishes the expertise available through circulars to various stakeholders. Some of the consultancy services available are soil testing, water and soap analysis, mushroom culture, blood group identification and testing, bio-compost preparation and diagnosis of diseases.

Student life

Student Amenities

Central instrumentation facilities
 UV-visible spectrophotometer
 Fourier transform infrared spectrophotometer
 High-performance liquid chromatography
 Atomic Absorption spectrophotometer

Library
 69,021 volumes of books
 10 International journal subscription
 3142 online journal subscribed
 Reprographic facility
 Digital library

Personal Care
For better individual personal assessment of students, each academic staff serves as a Staff Guardian for about ten students and maintains a record book for each.

Hostel
Four in-house student hostel halls for both gender

For all above detailed information, see

Sports
A 16-station multi gymnasium facility is developed. Besides four volleyball courts, two basketball courts, two tennis courts, one badminton court, two cricket grounds, two football fields, three kabaddi courts, tennikoit court, two kho-kho courts, facilities for indoor games and yoga are available.

References

External links
 

Madurai Kamaraj University
Education in Virudhunagar district
Educational institutions established in 1963
1963 establishments in Madras State
Colleges affiliated to Madurai Kamaraj University
Academic institutions formerly affiliated with the University of Madras